Bruce Bates is a Canadian retired professional soccer player.

Career
A native of the Vancouver area, Bates played amateur soccer locally for Richmond Olympic and briefly spent time as a reserve player for the Vancouver Whitecaps. At the age of 20 he impressed the coaches of the Calgary Boomers during open tryouts enough to win a spot with the NASL side. He appeared in ten matches that year, but the Boomers folded after one season. In 1982 he joined Calgary teammates Jürgen Stars and Tom Boric on the Tampa Bay Rowdies roster. He also played for the Rowdies during their run to the 1983 Indoor Grand Prix title.

Before the 1983 outdoor season began, he and Peter Gruber were dealt to Calgary Mustangs of the Canadian Professional Soccer League, where he was later named team captain. The CPSL folded after only one season.

In 1985 he played in the semi-pro Pacific Rim Soccer League for the New Westminster Queens Park Rangers along with other NASL alumni, Garry Ayre, Peter Stanley, and Carl Shearer. He and the Rangers won the season title with a 16-4-4 record, but fell, 3–0, to Vancouver Columbus in the PSRL President's Cup finals.

Honours
North American Soccer League
1983 Indoor Grand Prix: Champion
Pacific Rim Soccer League
1985: Champion
1985: President's Cup finalist

References

External links
NASL stats

1960 births
Living people
Canadian Professional Soccer League (original) players
Canadian expatriate soccer players
Expatriate soccer players in the United States
Canadian expatriate sportspeople in the United States
North American Soccer League (1968–1984) players
North American Soccer League (1968–1984) indoor players
Calgary Boomers players
Tampa Bay Rowdies (1975–1993) players
Association football defenders
Canadian soccer players
Soccer people from British Columbia
Calgary Mustangs (CPSL) players